The Kumho Museum of Art is an art museum in Seoul, South Korea.

See also
List of museums in South Korea

External links
Official site 

Art museums and galleries in Seoul